This Committee of Fifty, sometimes referred to as Committee of Safety, Citizens' Committee of Fifty or Relief and Restoration Committee of Law and Order, was called into existence by Mayor Eugene Schmitz during the 1906 San Francisco earthquake. The Mayor invited civic leaders, entrepreneurs, newspaper men and politicians—but none of the members of the San Francisco Board of Supervisors—to participate in this committee in whose hands the civil administration of San Francisco would rest.

Schmitz thought it necessary to form this body to manage the crisis during the disaster, although there was no legal basis for it. It first assembled in the basement of the ruined Hall of Justice on the afternoon of the earthquake, Wednesday, April 18, at 3 p.m. By 5 p.m. the location became dangerous and the Committee crossed Portsmouth Square to meet at the Plaza Hotel, which in turn had to be abandoned two hours later. At 8 p.m. the Committee assembled at the Fairmont Hotel's ballroom, sitting along the edge of the stage and on packing cases. At this point, the 19 sub-committees were set up. Shortly after 11 p.m. they dispersed.

Overnight the Fairmont Hotel burned down. On Thursday, April 19, at 6 a.m., the Committee met at the North End police station. At 11 a.m. they had to abandon the police station because of the scorching heat, and reconvened at 2 p.m. at Franklin Hall, on Fillmore Street, where they stayed for the remainder of the crisis, which became known as Temporary City Hall. At 4.30 p.m. Abe Ruef appeared there. He had not been called to be a member, but invited himself, and Mayor Schmitz accepted his offer, and he became chairman of an additional sub-committee, trying unsuccessfully to relocate the Chinese. Actually, there were more than a hundred members, but they never met all together, since during the chaos members came and went as they could or would.

Members 

On April 19, 1906, The New York Times published the first list of the members of the committee with 49 names - it did not include that of the Mayor - which originated the name Committee of Fifty. Later, more and more people went to the meetings and here are the names of people who were mentioned by different sources as members:

Sub-Committees 

 Relief of the Hungry, chairman Rabbi Jacob Voorsanger
 Housing the Homeless, chairman W. J. Bartnett; Fairfax W. Wheelan
 Relief of Sick and Wounded, chairwoman Katharine Felton
 Drugs and Medical Supplies, chairman Dr. Harris
 Relief of Chinese, chairman Rev. Filben
 Transportation of Refugees, chairman Thomas Magee
 Citizens' Police
 Auxiliary Fire Department
 Restoration of Water Supply, chairman Frank P. Anderson
 Restoration of Light and Telephones, chairman Rudolph Spreckels
 Restoration of Fire in Dwellings, chairman Jeremiah Dinan
 Restoration of Abattoirs
 Resumption of Transportation, chairman Thornwall Mullally
 Resumption of Civil Government, chairman Garett McEnerney
 Resumption of the Judiciary, chairman Judge Charles W. Slack
 Resumption of Retail Trade
 Organization of Wholesalers
 Finance, chairman James D. Phelan
 Sanitation
 Relocation of the Chinese, chairman Abe Ruef
 History and Statistics, chairman Frank S. Drum

References

External links 

 List of Members (many names misspelled)
 List of Members published by The New York Times on April 19

Sources 

 Gordon Thomas & Max Morgan Witts: The San Francisco Earthquake (New York: Stein and Day, 1971; London: Souvenir Press, 1971; reprinted Dell Paperback, 1972, SBN 440–07631)

1906 San Francisco earthquake
1900s in San Francisco
Organizations based in San Francisco